Wilhelmus Antonius Maria Luijpen, O.S.A. a.k.a. Nicodemus Wim (Nico) Luijpen (22 May 1922, Hilversum – 29 September 1980, Eindhoven) was a Dutch philosopher and Catholic priest of the Order of St. Augustine. An existential phenomenologist, Luijpen's works greatly contributed to the spread of Existentialism and phenomenology in Catholic intellectual circles in Europe and in the United States, having influenced generations of Catholic philosophers and theologians.   
Nicodemus Wim 
Having studied at Rome, Paris, Leuven and Fribourg, his intellectual and philosophical formation moved away from Neo-Scholasticism to Existential phenomenology through his study of contemporary Continental thinkers like Martin Heidegger, Maurice Merleau-Ponty, Gabriel Marcel and Jean-Paul Sartre as well as Leuven philosophers like Alphonse de Waelhens and Albert Dondeyne.

References

External links
 WorldCat Identity

1922 births
1980 deaths
20th-century Dutch philosophers
Augustinian friars
20th-century Dutch Roman Catholic priests
Existentialist theologians
People from Hilversum
Academic staff of Tilburg University
Academic staff of the Delft University of Technology